Aphaenops eskualduna is a species of beetle in the subfamily Trechinae. It was described by Coiffait in 1959.

References

eskualduna
Beetles described in 1959